The traditional Chinese calendar divides a year into 24 solar terms. Báilù, Hakuro, Baengno, or Bạch lộ is the 15th solar term. It begins when the Sun reaches the celestial longitude of 165° and ends when it reaches the longitude of 180°. It more often refers in particular to the day when the Sun is exactly at the celestial longitude of 165°. In the Gregorian calendar, it usually begins around September 7 and ends around September 23. Mid-Autumn Festival is celebrated around this time.

Pentads

鴻雁來, 'The wild geese come' – referring to the southward migration of geese. 
玄鳥歸, 'The dark birds return' – 'dark birds' refer to swallows. 
群鳥養羞, 'Birds stock their hoards' – i.e. in preparation for winter.

Date and time

References

Autumn
15